K-Rock is a common radio brand, generally carried by radio stations airing a modern rock format.  The brand is currently owned by Audacy, Inc. which acquired it as part of the merger with CBS Radio which owned the K-Rock brand in the United States since 1986.  Then known as Infinity Broadcasting, CBS acquired the K-Rock brand after purchasing noted Los Angeles rock station KROQ-FM, its callsign the origin of the "K-Rock" name.  In Canada, the K-Rock trademark is held by Rogers Media, owner of CIKR-FM ("K-Rock 105.7") in Kingston, Ontario.  Most other K-Rock stations in Canada are owned by the Stingray Digital Group.

See also
 K-Rockathon
 K-Rock Centre

References

External links
Entercom
Rogers Radio
Newcap Radio

Lists of radio stations